Events in the year 1971 in Belgium.

Incumbents
Monarch: Baudouin
Prime Minister: Gaston Eyskens

Events
 29 September to 1 October – Emperor Hirohito's state visit to Belgium.
 7 November – 1971 Belgian general election
 21 November – Brussels Agglomeration Council election

Publications
 Paul-Henri Spaak, The Continuing Battle: Memoirs of a European, 1936–1966, translated by Henry Fox (Boston, Little, Brown)

Births
 25 October – Annemie Bogaerts, chemist 
 15 December – Arne Quinze, conceptual artist

Deaths
 24 February – Albert De Vleeschauwer (born 1897), politician
 28 June – Camille Clifford (born 1885), actress

References

 
1970s in Belgium
Belgium
Years of the 20th century in Belgium
Belgium